Zeekr is a premium electric automobile brand owned by Geely Automobile Holdings. Founded in 2021, it specializes in electric cars. As a smart mobility technology company, ZEEKR operates on a user-oriented enterprise philosophy.

ZEEKR's products are built on the EV-focused Sustainable Experience Architecture (SEA). The SEA was created to meet evolving users requirements by integrating hardware, software, and ecosystems leading to the creation of a new mobility lifestyle.

ZEEKR started delivering the 001 vehicles in October 2021. In 2022 ZEEKR delivered 71,941 ZEEKR 001 to customers across more than 330 cities in China. Its subsidiary ZEEKR Power covers more than 110 cities with over 660 stations

History
Zeekr was founded in March 2021 as a premium electric mobility brand for battery-powered vehicles by the Geely Group to compete against Nio and Tesla, among others. Its first model, the Zeekr 001 was officially launched in April 2021. The Zeekr models are to be based on the SEA platform presented in Autumn 2020. 

In December 2021, Geely announced that Zeekr would be collaborating with Waymo to develop and provide all-electric, autonomous ride-hailing vehicle for the Waymo One autonomous mobility service in the United States. The vehicle integrated with Waymo’s technology was unveiled in Los Angeles in November 2022. 

In January 2022, a cooperation between Zeekr and Mobileye was announced to expand their strategic technology partnership with a goal to deliver the world’s first consumer autonomous vehicles with L4 capabilities by 2024 

In August 2022, Zeekr announced their cooperation with CATL, making them the first brand to use CATL's Qilin long range batteries for global mass production. The Zeekr 001 will be the first model to use the new batteries enabling them to have a pure electric range exceeding 1000km.

ZEEKR raised $500 million in its first external fundraising from five investors including Intel Capital, CATL, Bilibili in August 2021. On February 13, 2023, ZEEKR is valued at $13 billion after it raised $750 million from five investors.

The name of the brand is made up of Generation Z and the term geek.

Models
Zeekr 001
The Zeekr 001 was presented as the first model in April 2021 at the Auto Shanghai. The launch took place in October 2021 in the Mainland Chinese market. From 2022, the 001 will also be marketed outside China. The Geely Group already showed a first preview of this vehicle in September 2020 with the Zero Concept. However, this was still presented under the Lynk & Co brand.

The Zeekr 001 claims to be world’s first mass-produced pure electric shooting brake. Designed in Sweden at ZEEKR Design Gothenburg, the 001 measures (LxWxH) 4970mm, 1999mm, 1560mm with a wheelbase of 3005mm and offers 2144 litres of storage space. With e-motors on front and rear axles, the Zeekr 001 is able to put out a combined 400kW of power with 700Nm of torque, allowing the vehicle to achieve a top speed exceeding 200km/h and 0-100km/h acceleration in 3.8 seconds.

In January 2023, the 2023 ZEEKR 001 has been announced. It has an advanced driver assist function powered by Mobileye’s SuperVision system with dual 7nm EyeQ5H chips.

Zeekr 009
The Zeekr 009 is a luxury large MPV launched in 2022. The six-seat fully electric MPV claims to be the world’s first pure electric luxury MPV. It is world’s first model to utilize CATL’s ultra-long range cell-to-pack Qilin batteries.

The Zeekr 009 comes in at 5209 millimeters (205 inches) long, 2024 mm (80 in) wide, and 1867 mm (74 in) tall with a wheelbase of 3205 mm (126 in).

Zeekr X
The Zeekr X (003) is a premium urban SUV.

M-Vision
Concept vehicle built on SEA-M architecture to showcase the architecture’s fundamental features such as expansive interior, open seat choice, and placement option, no B-pillar, and robust electrical/electronic (E/E) backbone supporting autonomous drive and connected devices.

M-Vision is a base model that can be developed for a range of future mobility products including robotaxis, multi-purpose vehicles, and logistics vehicles.

Sales 
In the first year of sales, Zeekr sold 6,007 vehicles in China.

In 2022, Zeekr delivered 71,941 vehicles to users.

Manufacturing
ZEEKR’s factory is a self-proclaimed “smart, agile and connected” factory. It is has a manufacturing capacity of up to 300,000 vehicles per year and can be expanded further.

See also
 Lynk & Co

References

External links
 

Geely brands
Car manufacturers of China
Chinese brands
Electric vehicle manufacturers of China
Chinese companies established in 2021
Vehicle manufacturing companies established in 2021